Paul Noone (born 1979) is a former Gaelic footballer who played for the Roscommon county team.

He won a Connacht Under-21 Football Championship in 1999. He was then part of the team that knocked future All-Ireland champions Galway out of the Connacht Senior Football Championship and into the newly created All-Ireland Senior Football Championship qualifiers.

Noone also played for Donegal Boston.

References

Living people
Year of birth missing (living people)
Donegal Boston Gaelic footballers
Gaelic football backs
Irish expatriate sportspeople in the United States
Roscommon inter-county Gaelic footballers
1979 births